is a town located in Hata District, Kōchi Prefecture, Japan. , the town had an estimated population of 10,504 in 5443 households, and a population density of 56 persons per km². The residents speak a distinct dialect of Japanese known as Hata-ben.

Geography
Kuroshio is located in southwestern Kōchi Prefecture on the island of Shikoku. It has a long coastline facing the Pacific Ocean to the southeast. Kuroshio is located two hours (by car or train) west of Kōchi City.

Neighbouring municipalities 
Kōchi Prefecture
 Shimanto City
 Shimanto Town

Climate 
Kuroshio has a humid subtropical climate (Köppen climate classification Cfa) . Winter (late November through to mid March) can be very dry and chilling with many homes and schools using kerosene heaters to keep warm. It occasionally snows in the winter though often does not last the day due to the town's close proximity to the coast. The summer months (July - September) are hot and humid. Rainy season is in June and generally lasts three weeks. Kochi experiences a typhoon season which lasts from July until September. Spring and autumn are mild months with some wet and windy days.

Demographics
Per Japanese census data, the population of Kuroshio in 2020 is 10,262 people. Kuroshio has been conducting censuses since 1960.

History 
As with all of Kōchi Prefecture, the area of Kuroshio was part of ancient Tosa Province.  During the Edo period, the area was part of the holdings of Tosa Domain ruled by the Yamauchi clan from their seat at Kōchi Castle. Following the Meiji restoration, the village of Saga (佐賀村) was established within Hata District, Kōchi with the creation of the modern municipalities system on October 1, 1889. Saga was raised to town status on November 3, 1940. On March 20, 2006, Saga merged with the neighboring town of Ōgata to form the town of Kuroshio.

Government
Kuroshio has a mayor-council form of government with a directly elected mayor and a unicameral town council of 14 members. Kuroshio contributes one member to the Kōchi Prefectural Assembly. In terms of national politics, the town is part of Kōchi 2nd district of the lower house of the Diet of Japan.

Economy
The local economy is dominated by commercial fishing, notably pole-and-line fishing for Tosa skipjack tuna, and by agriculture, including shiitake mushrooms and  greenhouse horticulture, flowers, and paddy rice. In recent years, sun-dried salt has become a representative specialty product. Seasonal tourism, particularly in the summer for camping and surfing is playing an increasing role in the local economy.

Education
Kuroshio has eight public elementary schools and two public middle schools operated by the town government, and one public high school operated by the Kōchi Prefectural Board of Education. The town participates in the JET Programme, employing two representatives who regularly visit the junior high schools and elementary schools to teach English.

Every year in late August, during the summer vacation, twelve third year students chosen from Kuroshio's two junior high schools travel to Hamilton, New Zealand. There they participate in a homestay with families of students who attend Hamilton's Fairfield Intermediate School.  The Kuroshio students are accompanied by a Kuroshio Board of Education representative, two teachers and one of the JET participants (usually a New Zealander).  The students participate in school activities and ESL classes while at Fairfield Intermediate. Occasionally Fairfield Intermediate have sent a group of students and teachers to visit Kuroshio.  The relationship between the two schools began in 1999.

Transportation

Railway
Tosa Kuroshio Railway - Nakamura Line
  -  -  -  -  -  -  -  -  -  -

Highways 
  Kōchi Expressway

Local attractions
Irino Matsubara, National Place of Scenic Beauty. Baby turtles can be seen entering the water at sunrise from August through September on Irino Beach. Local volunteers help to protect the nests and the young turtles from birds and the trampling feet of beach goers.  The volunteers are happy to include early morning spectators in the task of preparing and protecting the newly hatched turtles for their first experience of the open sea. During Golden Week (Japan) Kuroshio's Seaside Gallery hosts the annual T-shirt Art Exhibition on Irino beach.  Many entries are made from both within Japan and internationally and draw a great number of tourists to the area.
Kobushinosata onsen is located on Japan National Route 56, ten minutes east of Saga.  Many pilgrims on the Shikoku Pilgrimage stop at this onsen.

Noted people from Kuroshio
Akatsuki Kambayashi, author

References

External links 

  

Towns in Kōchi Prefecture
Kuroshio, Kōchi
Populated coastal places in Japan